"That Ain't My Truck" is a song co-written and recorded by American country music artist Rhett Akins.  It was released in May 1995 as the third single from his debut album A Thousand Memories.  The song spent 21 weeks on the U.S. Billboard Hot Country Songs charts, peaking at number 3 in mid-1995. It also reached number 7 on the RPM Country Tracks chart in Canada.  It was written by Akins, Tom Shapiro and Chris Waters.

Content
The song is an up-tempo in which the narrator ends up on the losing end of a relationship. His significant other chooses another guy to continue a relationship with and the narrator knows this by driving by her house and seeing another man's truck in her driveway.

Critical reception
Deborah Evans Price, of Billboard magazine reviewed the song favorably saying that the song "sounds like a winner".

Music video
The music video was directed by Mary Newman-Said and premiered in mid 1995. The video was filmed around Tucson, Arizona.

Chart performance
"That Ain't My Truck" debuted at number 65 on the U.S. Billboard Hot Country Singles & Tracks for the week of May 13, 1995.

Year-end charts

References

1995 singles
1995 songs
Rhett Akins songs
Songs written by Rhett Akins
Songs written by Tom Shapiro
Songs written by Chris Waters
Decca Records singles
Song recordings produced by Mark Wright (record producer)
Songs about cars
Songs about heartache